Mohammed Rahoma Ahmed (born 5 May 1984) is a Libyan futsal player

Rahoma played for the Libya national futsal team at the 2008 FIFA Futsal World Cup.

Honors 

 African Futsal Championship:
 2008
 Arab Futsal Championship:
 2007, 2008

References

1984 births
Living people
Libyan men's futsal players